Ribe Amt is a former county (Danish: amt) on the Jutland peninsula of southwest Denmark. It included Denmark's fifth largest city, Esbjerg. The county was abolished effective January 1, 2007, when it merged into Region of Southern Denmark (i.e. Region South Denmark). It was often considered coterminous with South West Jutland (Danish: Sydvestjylland).

List of County Mayors

Municipalities (1970-2006)

Billund
Blaabjerg
Blåvandshuk
Bramming
Brørup
Esbjerg
Fanø
Grindsted
Helle
Holsted
Ribe
Varde
Vejen
Ølgod

Former counties of Denmark (1970–2006)
Region of Southern Denmark